Eduard Prades Reverte (born 9 August 1987 in Tarragona) is a Catalan cyclist, who currently rides for UCI ProTeam . He was named in the startlist for the 2016 Vuelta a España.

Major results

2010
 1st GP Macario
 2nd Aiztondo Klasica
2011
 1st Aiztondo Klasica
 1st Prueba Santa Cruz
 1st Stage 3 Cinturó de l'Empordà
 2nd Trofeo Eusebio Vélez
 3rd Copa de España
2012
 1st Copa de España
 1st Memorial Valenciaga
 1st Prueba Santa Cruz
2013
 1st  Overall Troféu Joaquim Agostinho
1st Stage 3
 7th Klasika Primavera
2014
 1st Stage 1 GP Abimota
 1st Minamiuonuma Road-Japan Pro Tour
 2nd Overall Volta ao Alentejo
1st Stage 2
 4th Klasika Primavera
 7th Overall Volta ao Algarve
 7th Overall Tour de Hokkaido
 8th Overall Tour de Ijen
2015
 1st Coppa Sabatini
 1st Stage 8 Volta a Portugal
 1st  Mountains classification Vuelta a la Comunidad de Madrid
 5th Giro dell'Emilia
 6th Overall Tour de Beauce
 6th Gran Premio Bruno Beghelli
 10th Memorial Marco Pantani
2016
 1st Philadelphia International Cycling Classic
 1st Stage 1 Volta Internacional Cova da Beira
2017
 5th Coppa Sabatini
 9th Klasika Primavera
 9th Coppa Bernocchi
 10th Overall Giro della Toscana
2018
 1st  Overall Tour of Turkey
 1st  Overall Tour of Norway
 2nd Overall Tour de Yorkshire
 3rd Overall Vuelta a Castilla y León
 4th Overall Tour de Luxembourg
 4th GP Miguel Induráin
 6th Trofeo Lloseta–Andratx
 9th Overall Tour du Limousin
2019
 1st  Overall Vuelta a Aragón
 3rd Klasika Primavera
 8th Overall Tour de la Provence
1st Stage 2
 9th Overall Vuelta a la Comunidad de Madrid
 9th GP Industria & Artigianato di Larciano
 10th Overall Vuelta a Castilla y León
 10th Bretagne Classic
2020
 3rd Circuito de Getxo
2021
 2nd Tour de Vendée
 6th Overall Arctic Race of Norway

Grand Tour general classification results timeline

References

External links

1987 births
Living people
Spanish male cyclists
Cyclists from Catalonia
Sportspeople from Tarragona
21st-century Spanish people